Armenia competed at the 2020 Summer Olympics in Tokyo. Originally scheduled to take place from 24 July to 9 August 2020, the Games were postponed to 23 July to 8 August 2021, because of the COVID-19 pandemic. It was the nation's seventh consecutive appearance at the Summer Olympics in the post-Soviet era.

Medalists

Competitors
The following is the list of number of competitors in the Games.

Athletics

Field events

Boxing

Armenia entered three male boxers into the Olympic tournament. Koryun Soghomonyan scored a round-of-16 victory to secure a spot in the men's flyweight division at the 2020 European Qualification Tournament in London, United Kingdom.

Gymnastics

Artistic
Armenia entered one artistic gymnast into the Olympic competition. Set to compete in his third Games, Artur Davtyan booked a spot in the men's individual all-around and apparatus events, by finishing ninth out of the twelve gymnasts eligible for qualification at the 2019 World Championships in Stuttgart, Germany.

Men

Judo

Armenia entered one male judoka into the Olympic tournament based on the International Judo Federation Olympics Individual Ranking.

Shooting

Armenia entered one shooter at the games, after getting the allocation quotas.

Qualification Legend: Q = Qualify for the next round; q = Qualify for the bronze medal (shotgun)

Swimming

Armenia entered two universality swimmers.

Weightlifting

Armenian weightlifters qualified for two quota places at the games, based on the Tokyo 2020 Rankings Qualification List of 11 June 2021.

Wrestling

Armenia qualified six wrestlers for each of the following classes into the Olympic competition. Two of them finished among the top six to book Olympic spots in the men's Greco-Roman wrestling (77 and 97 kg) at the 2019 World Championships, while two additional licenses were awarded to the Armenian wrestlers, who progressed to the top two finals of the men's freestyle 57 and 65 kg, respectively, at the 2021 European Olympic Qualification Tournament in Budapest, Hungary. Two Armenian wrestlers claimed one of the remaining slots each in the men's Greco-Roman 60 and 67 kg, respectively, to complete the nation's roster at the 2021 World Qualification Tournament in Sofia, Bulgaria.

Freestyle

Greco-Roman

See also
 Armenia at the 2020 Summer Paralympics

References

Nations at the 2020 Summer Olympics
2020
2021 in Armenian sport